Say Ta Lone Maung Phone is a Burmese horror television series. It was rated as PG-13. It aired on MRTV-4, from December 30, 2021 to February 1, 2022, on Mondays to Fridays at 19:00 for 24 episodes.

Cast
Min Phone Myat as Maung Phone
Mone as Sakar Wah
Kyaw Htet as Sein Thaung
Khaing Thazin Ngu Wah as Nwe Wah
Yan Lin Aung as Mar Ga
Su Lin Shein as Khattar
Khin Moht Moht Aye as Daw Tin Aye
Hein Yatu as Aye Htun
Nay Yee Win Lai as Ma Wai
A Lin Thit as Min Sein

References

Burmese television series
MRTV (TV network) original programming